Folke the Fat, according to Gesta Danorum by the 12th century Danish chronicler Saxo Grammaticus, was the most powerful man in Sweden around 1100. He married Ingegerd Knutsdotter of Denmark, daughter of the Danish king Canute IV who was murdered in 1086. Folke and Ingrid had the sons Knut and Benedict according to Saxo. The chronicler furthermore reports that Folke was the paternal grandfather of Birger Brosa, who was still alive at the time of writing.

See also 
 House of Bjelbo
 Folkung

Notes

References 
 American pictures - Genealogy of Folke (contains disputed claims)

Swedish politicians
11th-century Swedish people
House of Bjelbo
Swedish jarls